United Nations Security Council Resolution 271, a resolution adopted on September 15, 1969, in response to an arson attack on the Jami'a Al-Aqsa in Jerusalem by Denis Michael Rohan, the Council grieved at the extensive damage caused by the arson.  The Council determined that the execrable act only highlighted Israel's need to respect previous UN Resolutions and condemned Israel for failing to do so.

The resolution was adopted by 11 votes to none; Colombia, Finland, Paraguay and the United States abstained.

See also
 Arab–Israeli conflict
 List of United Nations Security Council Resolutions 201 to 300 (1965–1971)

References 
Text of the Resolution at undocs.org

External links
 

 0271
 0271
20th century in Jerusalem
1969 in Israel
September 1969 events